Edelsten is a surname. Notable people with the surname include:

Brynne Edelsten (born 1983), American television personality, socialite, actress and fitness instructor
David Edelsten (1933–2012), English writer, British Army officer and charity organizer
Geoffrey Edelsten (1943–2021), Australian medical entrepreneur
John Edelsten (1891–1966), British Royal Navy officer